South Yunderup is a township near Mandurah, Western Australia, located on the south bank of the Murray River within the Shire of Murray. Its postcode is 6208, and in the 2011 Census, it had a population of 2,235 with a median age of 50. South Yunderup is also the second-largest township in the Shire of Murray after the main town, Pinjarra.

Overview
South Yunderup is predominantly built upon a network of canals at the mouth of the Murray River. This has made South Yunderup a popular retirement place for many Western Australians as it is relatively isolated (only one road connects the township to Mandurah and Pinjarra. However, there is still significant development of large subdivisions around the township, including the Austin Cove development by Satterley.

Yunderup Sports Club is situated on the corner of Delta Drive and South Yunderup Road and has approximately 500 members incorporating tennis, bowls, darts and social activities.

References

Towns in Western Australia
Shire of Murray